The Terekeme people are an ethnic group of Azerbaijanis who live in Dagestan and in some southern regions of Azerbaijan as well as  Turkey. The population is mainly engaged in cattle breeding and is most often seen as nomads.

The Terekemes are Shia Muslims of the Jafari (Caferi) strand and speak the Terekeme dialect of Azerbaijani language.

See also
Tarakama (dance), dance originated by the Terekeme
Peoples of the Caucasus in Turkey
Karapapak
Azerbaijani people

References

Azerbaijani tribes
Ethnic groups in Russia
Ethnic groups in Turkey